Flirting with Fate is a 1938 American comedy film directed by Frank McDonald and written by Joseph Moncure March, Charlie Melson and Ethel La Blanche. The film stars Joe E. Brown, Leo Carrillo, Beverly Roberts, Wynne Gibson, Steffi Duna, Charles Judels and Stanley Fields. The film was released on December 2, 1938, by Metro-Goldwyn-Mayer.

Plot

Cast 
Joe E. Brown as Dan Dixon
Leo Carrillo as Sancho Ramirez
Beverly Roberts as Patricia Lane
Wynne Gibson as Bertha
Steffi Duna as Carlita
Charles Judels as Don Luis Garcia
Stanley Fields as Fernando
Leonid Kinskey as Pedro Lopez
Chrispin Martin as Solado 
Inez Palange as Señora Lopez
Irene Franklin as Hattie
Jay Novello as Manuel Del Valle
George Humbert as Del Rio
Lew Kelly as Herbie
Phillip Trent as Larry
Ann Hovey as Ida
Dick Botiller as Renaldo
Carlos Villarías as Police Captain

References

External links 
 

1938 films
1930s English-language films
American comedy films
1938 comedy films
Metro-Goldwyn-Mayer films
Films directed by Frank McDonald
Films produced by David L. Loew
American black-and-white films
1930s American films